The Refugee and Immigrant Center for Education and Legal Services (RAICES) is a nonprofit organization based in Texas that aims to provide legal services for immigrants. , it was the largest legal aid group of its kind in Texas. RAICES also runs Casa RAICES, which provides housing for thousands of undocumented immigrants and asylum seekers per year.

History 
RAICES was founded in 1987 (sometimes listed as 1986) to help Central American refugees in the United States.

In January 2016, RAICES' Executive Director, Jonathan Ryan, was part of a lawsuit filed against the state of Texas over House Bill 11, a law that made it a state felony to harbor undocumented immigrants. The lawsuit, which was filed by the Mexican American Legal Defense and Educational Fund on behalf of Ryan and two San Antonio landlords, alleged that the state was violating due process rights and circumventing federal authority over immigration policy. The law was temporarily paused due to an injunction issued by a federal judge, but in February 2017, a federal appeals panel ruled that the state could continue to enforce HB 11.

Viral 2018 fundraiser
In June 2018, publicity regarding the Trump administration's family separation policy led to the creation of an Internet campaign to collect funds for RAICES. 
A Facebook user in California created a fundraiser for RAICES called "Reunite an immigrant parent with their child". 
As of June 20, 2018, the fundraiser had raised $12 million for RAICES and was one of the largest in Facebook's history. 
The fundraiser was created in response to a "zero tolerance" immigration policy implemented in April 2018 by United States Attorney General Jeff Sessions, which requires United States Border Patrol agents to detain all adult immigrants suspected of crossing the border illegally.
From early May to mid June 2018, over 2,300 children were separated from their parents as a result of the zero tolerance policy.

National hotline
In June 2018 RAICES launched a "National Families Together Hotline" to assist family members who had been separated by current US immigration policy, to locate and reconnect with one another.

References

External links

1987 establishments in Texas
Non-profit organizations based in Texas
Immigration to the United States
Legal advocacy organizations in the United States
Organizations established in 1987
Refugee aid organizations in the United States